Traci Thirteen (also known as Girl 13 and Traci 13) is a superhero featured in American comic books published by DC Comics. The character first appeared in Superman vol. 2 #189 (February 2003), and was created by writer Joe Kelly and artist Dwayne Turner. Traci is the daughter of sorceress Meihui Lan and Doctor Thirteen, the latter  whom is an investigator, renowned skeptic of the supernatural, raises his daughter while disapproving the use of her mystic powers.

Over time, Traci separates from her father and starts her own superhero career as a sorceress, using both her magical and detective skills taught to her by her father and Elongated Man. She becomes an ally of the Superman Family and served as a love interest for Blue Beetle. In more recent stories, her Asian background is more prominent and is instead depicted as a lesbian, love interest of Natasha Irons, and both an member of Justice League Dark and Justice League Queer.

Traci 13 has made several animated media appearances, appearing in Teen Titans: The Judas Contract and debuting in the third season of Young Justice voiced by Lauren Tom. This version is named Traci Thurston.

Publication history 
Traci Thirteen first appeared in Superman vol. 2 #189 (February 2003), created by Joe Kelly and Dwayne Turner.

Fictional character biography
The latest in the long line of "Homo Magi", humans born with innate powers of sorcery, Traci is forbidden by her father, Doctor Thirteen, to practice magic, since her mother, Meihui Lan, died due to magical influences.

Traci moved to the Suicide Slum of Metropolis, determined to live on her own (with her pet iguana Leeroy). There she began to tap into the "urban magic" of Metropolis, and assumed the name of Girl 13, becoming a super hero of sorts. She met Superboy, who was attracted to her, but the feeling was not mutual. She used her magic to defend an injured Superman from a ghostly female ninja, along with fellow "Supergirls", Natasha Irons and Cir-El, with whom she formed a friendship. The Spectre's attack on magic during the Day of Vengeance mini-series does not seem to have had an effect on her powers.

Day of Vengeance
In the one-shot Day of Vengeance: Infinite Crisis Special Traci joined a large group of mystical heroes, including Doctor Occult, the Phantom Stranger, and Rex the Wonder Dog in cleaning up one of the Spectre's many rampages. The Rock of Eternity had exploded over Gotham City, unleashing multiple mystical horrors. The group soon recreated the rock, trapping the demons again.

One Year Later

Currently she resides with her father in Doomsbury Mansion, the ancestral home of her family, annoyed by his skepticism and boring outlook. Blue Beetle #16 established that Traci was raised and trained by Ralph Dibny and his wife Sue some time after her mother's death. A member of the Croatoans, the paranormal detective organization shown in 52, she travels around the world, sometimes with her father, and sometimes solo, fighting paranormal menaces with her growing magical abilities. She has recently started a relationship with Jaime Reyes, the current Blue Beetle. As a result of Jaime becoming a full-time member of the Teen Titans, she has also begun interacting with his teammates, such as during a recent Christmas adventure. For a period of time, Red Devil appeared to feel annoyed by Traci's presence as she distracted his new friend Blue Beetle. However, after she bought him a series of much desired video games, she became quickly accepted by Eddie. She is also featured on the cover of Teen Titans vol. 3 #66 as a potential new member. She opted not to join however, feeling it would be too weird to be on a team with her boyfriend, despite how much fun it would be to mess with his head. She does remain an ally of the Titans, helping them when they need it, especially during the prison riot caused by Shimmer and Jinx, using her magic to disable Jinx's connection to the Earth, thus undoing her barrier spell.

Beginning in May 2010, Traci began co-starring in a back-up feature in Teen Titans alongside Black Alice and Zachary Zatara. The feature ended in September 2010, when Teen Titans reverted to a standard 22-page format.

DC Rebirth 
During the 2016 DC Rebirth event, a newer version of Traci 13 was introduced. The character seemingly retains some of her earlier history in her previous version, being the daughter of the witch and homo magi Meihui Lan and Doctor Terry Thirteen, a well-known ghost hunter and skeptic. Unlike prior versions, the Thirteen family is depicted as being a family line of detectives and investigators who generally are irrationally skeptical of the supernatural. It is also expressed that in this continuity, while the exact circumstances are unknown in how her mother died, her father blames Traci and forbids her from using her magical abilities. When he suddenly disappeared, she became a freelance problem-solver specializing in the supernatural in Metropolis. She was later reunited with her father, who was revealed to have been possessed by demons shortly after her mother's death.

Superwoman (2016- 2017) 
Traci first appears in the Who Killed Superwoman storyline, warning Steel, Natasha, and Lana of Lena Luthor's plans, who has since taken the identity of "Ultrawoman", converted her body into a mechanized chasis, and worked to discredit her brother, Lex Luthor (now known as the "Superman of Metropolis"), whom have used her parapalegic condition (in which he inadvertently contributed to due to his arrogance in the past concerning her treatments) to his advantage as her contributions to LexCorp was kept secret with Lex gaining all the credit. Creating Bizarro Superwoman as her servants, she began causing havoc in Metropolis, prompting Taci 13's attention due to the nature of her powers making her have an affinity for its well-being, including becoming with concerns with acts that damage the city itself.

Traci later appears in the Midnight Hour storyline, with Natasha and Traci having been dating and Traci's powers having weakened. She helps the Superman Family and Maxima fight the entity known as M1dn1ght, a computer program made by Lena Luthor previously was given sentience by Superwoman unintentionally through her powers, using her powers to investigate the connection between the program and Lena. She informs the team of the connection as M1dn1ght uses black holes to kidnap Metropolis civilians. M1dn1iht manages to capture Superwoman, revealing her origin as a program made to save Lena should she be captured as a failsafe, before Superwoman escapes. Later, Traci uses her powers in order to send Superwoman into the "Void" a digital dimension of computer code in order to battle M1dn1ght once more, who has since worked to instead gain independence from Lena's programming. Not long after Steel and other citizens were saved by Superwoman and M1dn1ght temporary merging of the minds, Traci is mentioned to be working with the Superman Family in monitoring Metropolis's police scanners for criminal activities.

DC Universe (2018- Current) 
In between her appearances in Superwoman and Raven: Daughter of Darkness, it is mentioned in the 2018 Titans Special series by Natasha that both Traci and Nastasha had broken up. In the Raven: Daughter of Darkness series, Traci is later approached by Baron Winters in order to enlist her help against the Shadowriders, a group of entities who are hunting people who can use magic. While skeptical due to his reputation (from her father's account), she eventually briefly joins Winter's Night Force (consisting of familiar young magic users: Raven, Klarion the Witch Boy, Zach Zatara, Black Alice and newcomers Skye, and Robert Diaz) in order to combat the magic murdering villains and reveals herself as a fan of the Teen Titans hero, Raven.

Characterization

Sexuality & romances 
The character was originally presented as a heterosexual character, as her only relationship was with  Jaime Reyes prior to the rebooted continuity post Flashpoint. This depiction is consistent with other media versions of Traci, as she appears in both Young Justice and Teen Titans: The Judas Contract as a love interest to Jaime Reyes. When reintroduced in DC Rebirth, the character's history was retroactively rebooted with a new background, presenting the character in a relationship with fellow Superman Family hero, Natasha Irons.

Powers and abilities
As a member of the homo magi race, Traci 13 is able to naturally manipualte the forces of magic; during her publications in which she is portrayed as a teenaged magic user, she possesses a higher level of skill than other teenage magic users such as Black Alice and Zachary Zatara, the latter having once claimed to be the most powerful teenage magic user. Traci 13's specialzies in "urban magic", a type of magic that allows her to tap into magical forces residing within a city to perform magic. She also possess acute detective skills. Later version of her character also showcase her urban magic granting her an immense understanding in scientific concepts and technical skills, being able to understand binary code and able to utilize her powers in tandem with technology.   Her magical abilities can be bolstered through magical artifacts, having once appropriated the Staff of Arion, created by the aforementioned sorcerer; through concentration, she can manipulate its arcane energies to cast spells powerful enough to match against other powerful magical entities such as Eclipso.

Other versions

Terri Thirteen 
A character named Terri Thirteen briefly appeared in the series 52 as a member of the Croatoan Society. It is believed this character was actually Traci, but misnamed Terri due to editorial oversight.

Flashpoint
Traci appears in the 2011 Flashpoint crossover event, as revealed on DC's blog. In this reality, Traci rescues her father from Paris before it is destroyed by the Atlanteans, though she feels guilty she was unable to save her mother and siblings. She discovers that her father and superheroes from around the world are preparing to take drastic action to stop the Amazons and Atlanteans. She still remembers details of how reality should be, and meets Madame Xanadu for advice. When she tries to stop the heroes from launching nuclear weapons, her father drugs her and proceeds to start the countdown. Traci teleports to find help, but is unsuccessful, and returns to face her father. Doctor Thirteen magically attacks her, apparently having learnt the art of black magic. Failing to defeat her father, Traci decides to teleport to Western Europe to sacrifice herself. Doctor Thirteen arrives and finally accepts his daughter back. But when Traci is impaled by Amazons, Doctor Thirteen becomes enraged and begins a killing spree. Traci is restored to life from her spiritual connection to Earth and manages to stop her father by showing him the planetary consciousness. As the nuclear weapons are about to be activated, Doctor Thirteen uses his magic to destroy them. Traci rescues her father and teleported them back to Earth. It is revealed that they have both used up all of their magic.

In other media

Television
 Traci Thirteen appears in Young Justice, voiced by Lauren Tom. Introduced in the third season, this version is Traci Thurston, a member of the Team who is in a relationship with Jaime Reyes. In the fourth season, Thurston becomes a student under Zatanna and joins her Sentinels of Magic, during which the group becomes Doctor Fate as part of a rotation agreement between Zatanna and Nabu.
 In October 2017, The CW announced a one-hour drama series based on Traci Thirteen and her father Dr. Terrance Thirteen, titled Project 13, was in development, with Elizabeth Banks attached as an executive producer. However, the project never came to fruition.

Film
Traci Thirteen appears in Teen Titans: The Judas Contract, voiced by Masasa Moyo. This version works at a soup kitchen.

References

External links
 DCU Guide: Traci Thirteen

DC Comics female superheroes
DC Comics characters who can teleport
DC Comics characters who use magic
DC Comics fantasy characters
DC Comics LGBT superheroes
DC Comics witches
Fictional detectives
Comics characters introduced in 2003
Characters created by Joe Kelly